Daniel T. Pickett III (born July 27, 1968) is an American technology entrepreneur, private equity investor and philanthropist. He is the former CEO of Hudson River Capital Holdings, a private investment company in New York.

Early life and education 
Pickett was born in 1968 in Troy, New York.  Pickett was brought up in Mechanicville, New York, a small city north of Albany, where his parents owned a liquor store. Pickett received his degree from Rensselaer Polytechnic Institute (RPI) in the field of Industrial and Management Engineering.

Business career 
Beginning his career in 1990, Pickett worked at KeyCorp in Albany, New York. During his time with KeyCorp, Pickett worked in the area of technology and operations. Pickett was responsible for integrating the retail delivery platforms and networks of several acquisitions. Over a five-year period with KeyCorp, Pickett was appointed vice-president.

While serving at KeyCorp, Pickett co-founded  with his brother and his father in the basement of the family's liquor store.  helps large enterprises design, build, and support integrated technology environments.

In 1995 Pickett founded ACE Software Sciences, known for creating the MaxMilion software product.  MaxMilion was acquired in 1999 by ALLTEL. Pickett joined ALLTEL with the acquisition, where he ultimately became Senior Vice President and General Manager of Enterprise Banking Solutions.

In 2003, Pickett founded Hudson River Capital Holdings, a private investment company that specializes in growth-stage private equity investments.

In 2013, Inc. Magazine named  to its Build 100 list of most sustained growth companies.

In 2016,  was acquired by Zones, creating a $1.5 billion global technology company. In 2019, Pickett was appointed president and Chief Revenue Officer of Zones, LLC.

Pickett left Zones at the end of 2019 to focus full time on investments in social impact companies through Hudson River Capital Holdings, his private investment company.

In 2020, Pickett joined aptihealth as president and CEO, he is also a co-founder. Founded in 2017, aptihealth is a tech-enabled behavioral health engagement company.

Philanthropy 
In December, 2001, Pickett founded the Pickett Family Foundation. Pickett and his wife, Jennifer, host and support events for numerous charities in the Capital Region of New York.The foundation is focused and committed to making life better for individuals and communities by working and collaborating with technology leaders and other deserving philanthropic organizations, dedicated to making a positive difference in three focus areas: Education, Healthcare and Innovative Technology. During 2018, the Pickett family and Pickett Family Foundation donated over $500,000 to causes that addressed significant social issues.  In June 2019, Dan and Jennifer Pickett and the Pickett Family Foundation generously gifted $1 million to Albany Med in support of The Massry Family Children's Emergency Center, the region's only pediatric emergency department.

Politics 
In September, 2010, New York State Governor Andrew M. Cuomo named Pickett to the Upstate Business Advisory Council to advise his administration on business issues.

Pickett has been a regular political donor to Cuomo and has hosted fundraisers for Cuomo that have attracted business leaders from the greater Capital Region.

In July 2017, Pickett was named by Politico, along with 17 other donors including hedge fund managers Ronald Perelman, Steven Cohen and James Simons, as donors that have given more than $100k to Governor Andrew M. Cuomo's campaign committee during his second term.

Honors and awards 
In November 2011, Pickett's company  was named The Business Review's Company of the Year by the Albany Business Review.

In 2016, Pickett's company,  was one of only 48 companies named a CRN Triple Crown Winner – placing on the Solution Provider 500 list of the largest solution providers in North America according to revenue; the Fast Growth 150, which ranks the fastest-growing solution providers; and the Tech Elite 250 solution providers, with the highest level of certifications from major vendors.

References

1968 births
Living people
American technology company founders